Melica longiligulata is a species of grass endemic to the Sichuan province of China.

Description
The leaves themselves are cauline while leaf-sheath butt is purple coloured. The leaf-sheaths are tubular and are closed on one end. The surface of a leaf-blade is ribbed and is rough as well.

The pedicels are filiform, pubescent and hairy above. The spikelets have 2-3 fertile flores which are diminished at the apex while the sterile florets are not present. Both the upper and lower glumes are keelless, scarious, purple coloured, and have acute apexes.

The species' lemma have an obtuse apex and asperulous surface. Its palea have ciliolated keels and is 2-veined. The fruits have caryopsis and additional pericarp.

Ecology
Its blooms only in July.

References

longiligulata
Endemic flora of China
Flora of Asia